Vedrana Jakšetić (born 17 September 1996) is a Croatian volleyball player. She plays as setter for German club VfB Suhl LOTTO Thüringen.

References

External links
Vedrana Jakšetić at CEV.eu

1996 births
Living people
Croatian women's volleyball players
Sportspeople from Osijek
Expatriate volleyball players in France
Expatriate volleyball players in Germany
Mediterranean Games gold medalists for Croatia
Mediterranean Games medalists in volleyball
Competitors at the 2018 Mediterranean Games
Croatian expatriate sportspeople in Germany
Croatian expatriate sportspeople in France